La calandria ("The Calendar") is a 1933 Mexican film. It was directed by Fernando de Fuentes.

References

External links
 

1933 films
1930s Spanish-language films
Films directed by Fernando de Fuentes
Mexican black-and-white films
Mexican romantic drama films
1933 romantic drama films
1930s Mexican films